Sir Patrick Wahanga Hohepa  (born 1936) is a New Zealand Māori language academic. In the 2022 Queen's Birthday and Platinum Jubilee Honours, he was appointed a Knight Companion of the New Zealand Order of Merit, for services to Māori culture and education.

References

1936 births
Living people
Ngāpuhi people
University of Auckland alumni
Indiana University alumni
Academic staff of the University of Auckland
New Zealand Māori academics
Knights Companion of the New Zealand Order of Merit